WDWD (590 AM; "Faith Talk 590") is a Christian talk station serving the metro Atlanta market. It airs "The Eric Metaxas Show", "Family Talk with Dr. James Dobson", "Turning Point with Dr. David Jeremiah" and "The Narrow Path" hosted by Steve Gregg.

Its radio transmitter site, originally along North Druid Hills Road, is now located just north of Austell, Georgia, in west-northwest metro Atlanta.  The station's signal is aimed by a four-tower directional antenna array from the Austell transmitter location towards Atlanta (and avoiding interference with WWLX). In 2009, the station upgraded daytime transmitter power from 5,000 to 12,000 watts, while the nighttime power remains at 4,500 watts.  Also in 2009, the station started broadcasting in the AM HD Radio (hybrid digital) mode (which has been unavailable since 2013).

History

The station signed on with original broadcast callsign WAGA (once the sister station of the current television station by that name) on August 1, 1937. The Atlanta Journal newspaper, which owned WSB, had difficulty choosing programming to be carried on WSB between the two NBC radio networks, the Red Network and the Blue Network. Thus, the Journal established WAGA to carry the Blue Network while WSB carried programming from the Red Network. WAGA's on-air slogan during the station's early days was "Atlanta's Wave of Welcome".  The station's studios were located in the Western Union Building (current location of Telecom Tower SW corner of Marietta Street and Forsyth Street) in downtown Atlanta. WAGA's transmitter was located at Sugar Creek, three miles from the center of Atlanta. The station moved from 1450 AM to 1480 in 1941 (following the North American Regional Broadcasting Agreement), then to 590 AM in 1942. The 1480 kHz frequency later returned to the air under a new license as WYZE, with no affiliation to WAGA.

Due to FCC rules on station ownership, the Journal sold WAGA to Fort Industry Broadcasting of Toledo, Ohio in the 1940s. In 1948, the station acquired an FM sister when WAGA-FM (now WVEE) signed on. A year later, WAGA-TV signed on as Atlanta's second television station. Fort Industry changed its name to Storer Broadcasting in 1952.

In 1959, the station changed to a top 40 music format and changed its call sign to WPLO which was in reference to the new ownership, Plough Broadcasting Company.  Another format changed happened in 1966, when WPLO switched to a country music format.  In 1987, the station changed callsigns to WKHX and adopted the "Kicks 590" slogan still used on WKHX-FM 101.5, and began simulcasting on its FM sister. WKHX used to broadcast in Kahn/Hazeltine AM stereo with a "real country" format, which began in October 1992. Then, in November 1996, the station adopted the Radio Disney format and the callsign WDWD.

In September 2009, the station was forced off-air for a week when it was submerged by nearby Noses Creek, which reached double its flood stage during the historic and record-breaking 2009 Atlanta floods. The station had been shut down prior to the flood, so that once the equipment was completely disassembled and thoroughly cleaned and dried, nearly all of it was salvaged since there had been no short circuiting from the water.

On August 13, 2014, The Walt Disney Company put WDWD and 22 other Radio Disney stations up for sale, in order to focus more on digital distribution of the Radio Disney network. Disney originally planned to temporarily shut down the station on September 26, 2014. However, the station remained on the air with Radio Disney programming until it was sold.

On February 25, 2015, Radio Disney Atlanta filed to sell WDWD to South Texas Broadcasting, Inc., a subsidiary of the Salem Media Group. Salem bought the station for $2.75 million. The application to assign the station license was granted by the U.S. Federal Communications Commission on April 13, 2015, and the purchase was consummated on May 7, 2015. On March 10, 2015, Salem Media CEO Ed Atsinger revealed that Salem would move the WNIV/WLTA programming to WDWD after the completion of the sale. On May 11, 2015 WDWD changed its format to Christian talk, branded as "Faith Talk 590", with programming from Salem Radio Network.

References

External links

FCC History Cards for WDWD

DWD
Radio stations established in 1937
1937 establishments in Georgia (U.S. state)
Salem Media Group properties
DWD
Former subsidiaries of The Walt Disney Company